José França de Paula Ramos (born 4 June 1895, date of death unknown), known as just Paula Ramos, was a Brazilian footballer. He played in one match for the Brazil national football team in 1917. He was also part of Brazil's squad for the 1917 South American Championship.

References

External links
 

1895 births
Year of death missing
Brazilian footballers
Brazil international footballers
Place of birth missing
Association football midfielders
Americano Futebol Clube players
America Football Club (Rio de Janeiro) players